New Morning is a 1970 album by Bob Dylan, or the title song.

New Morning may also refer to:

Music
The New Morning, an American rock band
New Morning (Alpha Rev album) or the title song, 2010
New Morning (Johnny Coles album) or the title instrumental, 1982
New Morning (Misia album), 2014
A New Morning, an album by Suede, 2002
New Morning, an album by Dianne Reeves, 1997
New Morning, an album by Lisa Lynne, 2001
New Morning, an album by Papa Wemba, 2006
New Morning, an album by Sabrina Malheiros, 2008

Other uses
New Morning (club), Paris